Prince Bayush Razgildeyev was a Tatar warlord of the 17th century Time of Troubles. In 1612 he defended Arzamas lands and defeated Nogays, killed 500 people, captured the enemy banner, and freed about 7,000 hostages. For this feat he was awarded the title of Prince in 1613 by provisional rulers of wartime Russia, Trubetskoy and Pozharsky. This title was confirmed in 1618 by the czar Mikhail Feodorovich. He was the founder of Bayushev noble family in Russia.

Literature 

 Сборник исторических и статистических материалов о Симбирской губернии. Симбирск, 1868. — С. 259–261.

External links
  Текст царских грамот, данных мурзе Разгильдееву
  Статья о Поволжье в Смутное время

Tatar dukes and mirzas
17th-century Russian people